Whitestone is a suburban area of Nuneaton in Warwickshire in central England.
It is located approximately two miles south-east of Nuneaton town centre. Historically part of Attleborough, the area has developed its own identity following extensive housing developments since the 1950s and 1960s. Today, it is generally considered one of Nuneaton's more desirable areas.

Boundaries
Whitestone is bounded approximately by the West Coast Main Line, Eastboro Way (A4254), the River Anker, the borough boundary, and the Ashby-de-la-Zouch Canal.

For district (borough) council elections, Whitestone is split between two wards: Whitestone, and Attleborough. Each ward is represented by two councillors, elected by halves.

For county council elections, Whitestone is split between three electoral divisions: Nuneaton Whitestone, Nuneaton St Nicolas, and Bulkington. Each electoral division is represented by one county councillor.

For postal purposes, that part of Whitestone broadly north of Lutterworth Road has postcodes beginning "CV11 6––", while that part of Whitestone broadly to the south of Lutterworth Road has postcodes beginning "CV11 4––".

Whitestone, like the rest of Nuneaton, is located within the historic county of Warwickshire. It is also part of the administrative county of Warwickshire (i.e. it is covered by Warwickshire County Council) and the Warwickshire ceremonial county.

Population
In the 2011 census, a total of 6,876 people were recorded in Whitestone ward. However, the current ward boundaries exclude that part of Whitestone bounded by Lutterworth Road, Bulkington Lane, the Ashby-de-la-Zouch Canal and the West Coast Main Line, which falls instead in Attleborough ward. This area (minus The Hollows, Quarry Lane, Mill Close, Rutherford Glen, Loudon Gate, the south side of Lutterworth Road between the West Coast Main Line and the junction with Middelburg Close, plus Coughton Close and part of Upton Way on the Maple Park estate) corresponds to a super output area for statistical purposes, and had a population of 1,498 in the 2011 census. Adding these figures gives a total of 8,374 inhabitants.

History

The area takes its name from "The White Stone", a former milestone or guide post. This stone is still visible to travellers at the junction of Lutterworth Road, Bulkington Lane and Golf Drive, in front of the area's main shopping parade.

Until well into the 1920s, the area was largely undeveloped, the only notable buildings being farms (such as White Stone Farm, Quarry Farm and Thorn Hill) and a few large houses (such as Hazelwood and Quarry House). Apart from agriculture, the only industry in the area was quarrying: Quarry Farm (and later Quarry Lane) was built next to Attleborough Quarries, while Quarry House, further east, was named after an older quarry.

In 1905, Nuneaton Golf Club was established in the area, originally as a nine-hole course. Access was initially via the track that ran from the White Stone, north along a track that also led to farm land. This track later became Golf Drive.

In the mid-1920s and 1930s, houses were built along Lutterworth Road, Bulkington Lane and Gipsy Lane, but construction remained limited to minor ribbon development, with the only new roads to be built being Arden Road and Golf Drive.

The area was subject to bombing during the Second World War.  Bomb craters can still be seen in the fields behind White Stone beyond the Golf Course.  The second house along the B4114 from White Stone was subject to a direct hit.

In the decades following the Second World War, the area (now known as "White Stone", without the definite article) was seen as prime development land, and new housing estates began to be built. The first of these comprised the new streets of Whitestone Road and Stonewell Crescent, built on the site of White Stone Farm. This was shortly followed in the early 1960s by new streets off Golf Drive, named after golf courses and golfing terms. The shopping parade by the crossroads was also built at this time.

The late 1960s and the 1970s saw these estates expand (extending as far as Chetwynd Drive and Alderbrook Drive respectively), with new estates – and schools – built around Magyar Crescent and Purcell Avenue. For the first time, some of these estates included social housing. The name of the area was also changing: "Whitestone" was becoming one word instead of two.

The 1980s and 1990s brought major development: Crowhill Road was extended, with new housing developments on both sides. Further east, farmland belonging to Thorn Hill was turned over to housing; the farm's name lives on in Thornhill Drive. The rest of the estate's roads largely continued the golfing theme of existing nearby developments.

The most recent developments in Whitestone consist mainly of minor additions to existing estates and the conversion or modification of existing large houses.

The area's white stone has been subjected to graffiti by young people on several occasions, but thanks to the residents, it is always painted back to its original colour in line with Whitestone's tradition.

Schools
The area was originally, in the 1950s through to the early 1970s, served by the Park Avenue primary school in Attleborough. Some children in the Whitestone area also attended Attleborough ( Holy Trinity)  Church Infants School, and Caldwell County Junior School until the schools were later closed.

The area is now served by two primary schools: Whitestone Infant School (ages 4 to 7) and Chetwynd Junior School (ages 7 to 11). The infant school was originally opened in 1970 as Whitestone Primary School, intended for all 4- to 11-year-olds in the area. However, demand soon outstripped supply, and a second school, Chetwynd, was opened in 1972. At this time, Whitestone Primary became Whitestone First School, for children aged 4 to 8, while Chetwynd Middle School catered for pupils aged 8 to 12. This arrangement of first and middle schools continued until 1996, when all of Warwickshire's schools were brought back into line with the more traditional infant-junior system. Whitestone First thus became Whitestone Infant, and Chetwynd Middle became Chetwynd Junior.

Part of Chetwynd Junior School burned down in the 1999–2000 school year.

At secondary level, Whitestone is in the catchment area for George Eliot Academy (located roughly a mile away in Caldwell). The northern part of Whitestone is also in the catchment area for Etone College (located in central Nuneaton). Post-16 education is currently provided by King Edward VI College (in Nuneaton town centre) and North Warwickshire and Hinckley College (in eastern Nuneaton).

Community and leisure facilities
Community facilities in the area include Whitestone Community Centre (adjacent to Whitestone Infant School in Magyar Crescent), Whitestone Clinic (also in Magyar Crescent), and Paul's Land Pavilion, located by the Mill Close entrance to the area's largest recreation ground, Paul's Land (named after the Paul family, the previous owners, who bequeathed the land to the borough council for preservation as a green space).

Paul's Land is home to a number of playing fields and a large play area. It is linked to the Maple Park estate in southern Attleborough via a cable-stayed footbridge that crosses the West Coast Main Line. This bridge, known as the Maple Park Footbridge, was officially opened on 17 December 2004.

Whitestone also boasts many play areas, including the sizeable "Crowhill Park", located behind Crowhill Shopping Centre.

The area has three public houses: the Whitestone, (this was originally called The Hayrick when the Pub  was first built) on Meadowside; the Chetwynd Arms, on Chetwynd Drive; and the Crow's Nest, on Crowhill Road, name came from Crow Hill Farm, that was originally on the land where the road and the Public house was later built.

There are no purpose built places of worship in Whitestone, although Christadelphians use the Infant school for weekly meetings. The Anglican parish church for the area is Holy Trinity church in Attleborough.  There is also the Baptish Church in The Green, Attleborough.

Shopping facilities
Whitestone benefits from three local shopping areas:

Whitestone shops (including the area's sub-post office) on Lutterworth Road, at its intersection with Golf Drive;
Copsewood shops on Copsewood Avenue;
Crowhill Shopping Centre on Raven Way.
Garage (originally known as "Kings Garage" diagonally opposite White Stone. Once a BMC and later a SAAB dealer in the 1970s.

Additional shopping facilities can be found in nearby Attleborough and Horeston Grange, as well as in Nuneaton town centre.

Street names
As with many suburban developments, street names in Whitestone follow a number of themes:

Stately homes: Chatsworth Drive, Blenheim Close, Arlington Way, Sheringham Close, Chartwell Close, Ragley Way, Burghley Close, Newstead Close; however, Avebury Close (on the same estate) is named after an ancient monument rather than a stately home.
Thorny plants: Holly Walk, Blackthorn Grove, Bramble Close – almost certainly inspired by nearby Holly Tree Farm.
Horse-related names: Farriers Way, Stable Walk.
Places in the Yorkshire Dales: Grassington Drive, Stainforth Close, Arncliffe Close, Ingleton Close, Aysgarth Close, Malham Close, Leyburn Close, Woodhall Close, Hebden Way.
Warwickshire rivers and brooks: Rainsbrook Drive, Marchfont  Close, Inchford  Close, Leam Close, Pickford  Close, Alderbrook  Drive.
Shakespeare-related names: Shakespeare Drive, Hathaway Drive, Hamlet Close, Juliet Close, Oberon Close, Verona Close, Portia Close, Falstaff Close – possibly inspired by the much older Arden Road (named after the Forest of Arden, a name shared by Shakespeare's mother).
Golf-related names: Golf Drive, Wentworth Drive, Sunningdale Close, Birkdale Close, Hoylake Close, Fairway, Greenway, St Andrews Drive, Greenside Close, Turnberry Drive, Gleneagles Close, Carnoustie Close, Muirfield Close, Moorpark Close [sic], Hollinwell  Close, Dalmahoy Close.
Local farms: Hill Farm Avenue, Gorse Farm Road, Faultlands Close, Crowhill Road, Thornhill Drive.
Birds of prey: Eagle Close, Falcon Close, Osprey Close, Hawk Close.
Places in Suffolk: Lavenham Close, Cavendish Walk.
Explorers: Barne Close, Ross Way.
Local builders: Chetwynd Drive.
Composers: Purcell Avenue, Elgar Close, Tippett Close, Britten Close, Walton Close.
Local features and houses: Mill Close (named after Mill House), Quarry Lane (named after Quarry House, itself named after the nearby Attleborough Quarries), Slade Close (named after The Slade).
Nomadic peoples: Gipsy Lane, Magyar Crescent – the name of the latter being inspired by the (much older) former.
Middelburg Close: named after the Dutch city of Middelburg.

External links
 Chetwynd Junior School
 UK National Statistics

Areas of Nuneaton